The 1911 TCU football team represented Texas Christian University (TCU) as a member of the Texas Intercollegiate Athletic Association (TIAA) during the 1911 college football season. Led by Henry W. Lever in his first and only year as head coach, TCU compiled an overall record of 4–5. They played their home games at Morris Park in Fort Worth, Texas.

A game with Texas scheduled for October 7 was cancelled following the death of Billy Wasmund, the Longhorns's head coach.

Schedule

References

TCU
TCU Horned Frogs football seasons
TCU football